The men's shot put event at the 1975 European Athletics Indoor Championships was held on 9 March in Katowice.

Results

References

Shot put at the European Athletics Indoor Championships
Shot